The University of Duhok (UoD) is public university located in Duhok, Kurdistan.

The University describes itself as playing a vital role in developing the community by instigating socioeconomic, cultural, scientific as well as educational progress in the northern part of Iraq and saying that graduates from the University of Duhok currently contribute to the enhancement and capacity building in the public and private sectors of the Duhok Governorate. It claims to be the fast-growing institution in the city.

The University of Duhok was founded on 31 October 1992, following a resolution by the Parliament of the Kurdistan Regional Government to address the increasing demand for higher education in the region. The first colleges to be established in the university were the College of Medicine and the College of Agriculture.  Initially, the Medical College had 48 students while the College of Agriculture had 166.  During the first two years, the two embargoes imposed by the UN on Iraq and by the Iraqi Central Government on Kurdistan contributed to the slow-paced growth of the University and the poor economic conditions in Kurdistan.  After these hardships had passed, the university found itself in a position to steer towards advancement and fresh growth. Today, the UoD has 19 colleges with 69 Departments, more than 22942 undergraduate students and 837 postgraduate students.

The UoD provides facilities such as laboratories, libraries, computing services, sports facilities, housing accommodations and extra-curricular activities to all registered students.

The University of Duhok is a member of International Association of Universities (IAU), European Association for International Education (EAIE)], and Association of Arab Universities (AARU).

University of Duhok is ranked 141+  in the Times Higher Education (THE) Arab University Rankings 2022.

References

 Duhok University website

External links
 Duhok University website

Universities in Kurdistan Region (Iraq)
Duhok
Dohuk
Public universities
Educational institutions established in 1992
1992 establishments in Iraq